The 1925–26 Scottish Third Division was not completed as 
multiple clubs were unable to complete their fixtures due to the costs of meeting match guarantees and travel and other expenses being beyond their capacity to pay.

As a result, the championship was withheld, with the Third Division being dissolved: it would not be re-established until the 1946–47 season.

However, Forfar Athletic were promoted to the Scottish Second Division.

Table

References

External links
 Scottish Football Archive

Scottish Division Three seasons
3